Tindallia californiensis is a Gram-positive, extremely haloalkaliphilic, strictly anaerobic, acetogenic and motile bacterium from the genus of Tindallia which has been isolated from sediments from the Mono Lake in California.

References

Clostridiaceae
Bacteria described in 2003
Bacillota